Johan Lukas Wissman (born 2 November 1982) is a Swedish athlete from Helsingborg, specializing in the 200 and 400 m. He is the current national record holder in both of these events.

Wissman won the gold medal at the European Indoor Championships in Athletics 2009 in Torino, Italy. This was Johan's first and long awaited international gold medal at the time 45.89.

He finished second in 200 m at the World Indoor Athletics Championships 2004 and second in 400 m at the World Indoor Athletics Championships in 2008.

He also won the silver medal in the 200 m at the 2006 European Athletics Championships.

He came in seventh place in 400 m in the 2007 World Athletics Championships in Osaka, Japan and he finished 8th in the 2008 Olympic Summer Games.

At the 2010 European Athletics Championships he focused on the 200 m, after being marred by injuries for most of the season. Wissman made it to the semifinals, where he was 0.02 seconds from a spot in the final.

Personal bests 
 100 m - 10.44 s (2002)
 200 m - 20.30 s (national record for Sweden) (2007)
 400 m - 44.56 s (national record for Sweden) (2007)
 400 m, indoor - 45.89 (2009)

References

External links 
 
 Wissman efter ännu en bragdinsats - Retrieved from Expressen
 

1982 births
Living people
Swedish male sprinters
Athletes (track and field) at the 2004 Summer Olympics
Athletes (track and field) at the 2008 Summer Olympics
Sportspeople from Helsingborg
Olympic athletes of Sweden
European Athletics Championships medalists
World Athletics Indoor Championships medalists
21st-century Swedish people